CSS Charleston was a casemate ironclad ram built for the Confederate Navy (CSN) at Charleston, South Carolina during the American Civil War. Funded by the State of South Carolina as well as donations by patriotic women's associations in the city, she was turned over to the Confederate Navy and defended the city until advancing Union troops that threatened Charleston caused her to be destroyed in early 1865 lest she be captured. Her wreck was salvaged after the war and the remains have been obliterated by subsequent dredging.

Construction and description
James M. Eason was awarded a contract by the State of South Carolina to build a larger ironclad at Charleston in November 1862 after he finished the casemate ram . Funds were also contributed by the city's "Ladies' Gun-boat Association", which led to Charlestons nickname of the "Ladies' Gunboat". He began construction the next month and completed the ship in September 1863.

The ship was armed with two  smoothbore guns at the ends of the ship, probably Dahlgren guns, and four muzzle-loading Brooke rifles on the broadside that fired  projectiles, which would make them  guns although their exact type is unknown. Charleston was also fitted with a wrought-iron ram. Her crew numbered 150 officers and enlisted men.

Service
Once completed, Charleston served as the flagship of the CSN's Charleston Squadron together with the rams  and Chicora. Her only captain was Commander Isaac N. Brown. Its last known location was at

References

Bibliography 
 
 
 
 
 
 
 
 
 
 

Ironclad warships of the Confederate States Navy
Shipwrecks of the Carolina coast
Shipwrecks of the American Civil War
Ships built in Charleston, South Carolina
Maritime incidents in February 1865
1863 ships